The following is a timeline of the history of the city of Voronezh, Russia.

Prior to 20th century

 1586 - Fortress established.
 1590 - Fort burned by Tatars.
 1694 - Shipbuilding begins.
 1703 - Fire.
 1748 - Fire.
 1773 - Fire.
 1802 - Theatre troupe established.
 1826 -  opens.
 1833 - Braun's music shop in business (approximate date).
 1860 - Tsar Peter I monument erected.
 1868
 Rostov-on-Don-Voronezh railway begins operating.
 Koltsov memorial erected.
 1871
 Moscow-Voronezh railway begins operating.
  opens.
 1876 - Rostov-Voronezh railway begins operating.
 1897 - Population: 84,015.

20th century
 1901 - Population: 84,146.
 1913 - Population: 94,800.
 1918
 Voronezh State University established.
 Sirena literary journal begins publication.
 1926 - Population: 120,017.
 1928 - City becomes part of the Central Black Earth Region.
 1933 -  opens.
 1934
 City becomes part of the newly established Voronezh Oblast.
 Tsentralnyi Profsoyuz Stadion (Voronezh) (stadium) built.
 1937 - Voronezh State University's B.M. Kozo-Polyansky Botanical Garden established.
 1938 - Voronezh Dance Academy established.
 1939 - Population: 326,836.
 1947 - Football Club Fakel Voronezh formed.
 1954 -  opens.
 1959 -  rebuilt.
 1963 -  established.
 1965 - Population: 576,000.
 1968 -  active.
 1972 - Voronezh Airport begins operating.
 1979 - Population: 809,000.
 1985
  opens.
 Population: 850,000.
 1989 - 27 September: Alleged Voronezh UFO incident occurs.
 1990 - Proposal for construction of nuclear plant quashed.
 2000 - City becomes part of the Central Federal District.

21st century

 2004
  becomes mayor.
 Bombings.
 2008 - Sergey Koliukh becomes mayor.
 2009 
 Annunciation Cathedral, Voronezh built.
 Voronezh tram system is stopped.
 2010 - Population: 889,680.

See also
 Voronezh history
 
 Timelines of other cities in the Central Federal District of Russia: Moscow, Smolensk

References

This article incorporates information from the Russian Wikipedia.

Bibliography

External links

 Digital Public Library of America. Items related to Voronezh, various dates

Voronezh
voronezh
Years in Russia